Thomas Macpherson, 1st Baron Macpherson of Drumochter (9 July 1888 – 11 June 1965), was a Scottish businessman, and Labour Party politician.

Macpherson was the son of James Macpherson of Muirhead near Chryston in Lanarkshire. He was Chairman of Macpherson, Train & Co Ltd, food and produce importers and exporters. He was also involved in the Food Defence Plans organisation from 1938 to 1939 and served Chairman of the London Provision Exchange and as a Member of the Port of London Authority. He was Chairman of Romford Division Liberal Association before joining the Labour Party in 1934. In 1945 Macpherson was elected to the House of Commons as Member of Parliament (MP) for Romford, a seat he held until 1950. The following year, on 30 January 1951, he was raised to the peerage as Baron Macpherson of Drumochter, of Great Warley in the County of Essex.

Lord Macpherson of Drumochter married Lucy, daughter of Arthur Butcher, in 1920. He died in June 1965, aged 76, and was succeeded in the barony by his only son Gordon. Lady Macpherson of Drumochter died in 1984.

References

External links 
 
Kidd, Charles, Williamson, David (editors). Debrett's Peerage and Baronetage (1990 edition). New York: St Martin's Press, 1990, 

1888 births
1965 deaths
Macpherson, Thomas
Macpherson, Thomas
UK MPs who were granted peerages
Labour Party (UK) hereditary peers
Barons created by George VI